Machhike is a village in the Moga District of the Indian state of Punjab. It is part of the Nihal Singh Wala Assembly Constituency.

Geography 
It is located 10 km southeast of Nihal Singh Wala, 38 km southeast of Moga, and 60 km southwest of Ludhiana. The Machhike local language is Punjabi.

Demographics 
In the 2011 census, the population was 6,411. There is a 56.6% literacy rate with a 24.3% female literacy rate.

Images

References

Moga district
Panchayati raj (India)
Punjab
Villages in Moga district